Anderson Angus Aquino  (born 18 February 1986), known as Anderson Aquino , is a Brazilian footballer who plays as a striker.

In 2018–19, he signed in for Primeiro de Agosto in Angola's premier league, the Girabola.

Career statistics

Honours
Atlético Paranaense
Dallas Cup: 2005
Parana State Superleague: 2002

Sport
Campeonato Pernambucano: 2006, 2007
Campeonato Brasileiro Série B: 2006

FC Olimpi Rustavi
Umaglesi Liga: 2009-10

Coritiba
Campeonato Paranaense: 2011, 2012

References

External links
 Official web-site

1986 births
Living people
Brazilian footballers
Brazilian expatriate footballers
Club Athletico Paranaense players
Sport Club do Recife players
Paraná Clube players
Goiás Esporte Clube players
Brazilian expatriate sportspeople in Georgia (country)
Botafogo de Futebol e Regatas players
C.D. Primeiro de Agosto players
Coritiba Foot Ball Club players
FC Metalurgi Rustavi players
Ituano FC players
Santa Cruz Futebol Clube players
Clube Atlético Linense players
Expatriate footballers in Angola
Expatriate footballers in Georgia (country)
People from Foz do Iguaçu
Campeonato Brasileiro Série A players
Campeonato Brasileiro Série B players
Erovnuli Liga players
Association football forwards
Sportspeople from Paraná (state)